The Couronne de Bréona,  is a mountain of the Pennine Alps, located east of Les Haudères in the canton of Valais. It lies north of the Tsa de l'Ano, on the range between the valleys of Hérens and Moiry.

At , the path turns right to avoid a gravel field called Liapey d'Enfer, and at  reaches Remointse de Bréona, the temporary and more elevated shelters of the alpage.

References

External links
 Couronne de Bréona on Hikr

Mountains of the Alps
Alpine three-thousanders
Mountains of Valais
Mountains of Switzerland